Jana Small Finance Bank is a small finance bank that commenced operations on March 28, 2018, headquartered in Bangalore, India. The Reserve Bank of India issued a licence to the bank under Section 22 (1) of the Banking Regulation Act, 1949. Prior to becoming a bank, the company was India's largest microfinance institution, Janalakshmi Financial Services, founded July 24, 2006.

As a microfinance lender, the company survived large losses following the 2016 Indian banknote demonetisation, reporting total losses of ₹2,504 crore (US$ million) at the time of its conversion to a small finance bank. Jana reported in November 2019 that the September 2019 quarter was its first profitable quarter since demonetisation.

DigiGen 
DigiGen is a digital banking platform launched by Jana Small Finance Bank.

Shareholding 
Major investors in Jana include US-based private equity fund managers TPG Capital and HarbourVest Partners.

See also
 Banking in India
 List of banks in India
 Indian Financial System Code

References 

Small finance banks
Indian companies established in 2018
Banks established in 2018
Private sector banks in India
2018 establishments in Karnataka
Banks based in Karnataka